Pine Township is the name of some places in the U.S. state of Pennsylvania:

Pine Township, Allegheny County, Pennsylvania
Pine Township, Armstrong County, Pennsylvania
Pine Township, Clearfield County, Pennsylvania
Pine Township, Columbia County, Pennsylvania
Pine Township, Crawford County, Pennsylvania
Pine Township, Indiana County, Pennsylvania
Pine Township, Lycoming County, Pennsylvania
Pine Township, Mercer County, Pennsylvania

See also:
Pine Creek Township, Clinton County, Pennsylvania
Pine Creek Township, Jefferson County, Pennsylvania
Pine Grove Township, Schuylkill County, Pennsylvania
Pine Grove Township, Warren County, Pennsylvania
Pinegrove Township, Venango County, Pennsylvania
Piney Township, Clarion County, Pennsylvania

Pennsylvania township disambiguation pages